Helen Scott may refer to:

Helen Scott (actress), Australian actress
Helen Scott (cyclist) (born 1990), British sprint cyclist
Helen Grace Scott (1915–1987), alleged spy, collaborator with François Truffaut
Helen Hope Montgomery Scott (1904–1995), American socialite and philanthropist
Helen Milligan (born 1962), Scottish New Zealand chess player, née Helen Scott
Helen Scott (singer) in The Three Degrees
Helen Scott (murder victim) (died 1977) in World's End Murders

See also
Ellen Scott (disambiguation)